Deba Ray College, Nayapalli, Bhubaneswar is a government aided general college in Bhubaneswar, Odisha, India, which offer courses in higher secondary (+2) and under-graduate levels (+3 degree). The courses in the higher secondary level are affiliated to the Council of Higher Secondary Education, Odisha and courses offered in the under-graduate levels are affiliated to Utkal University, Bhubaneswar, Odisha, India.

History 
Deba Ray College was established in 1982 in Nayapalli, western part of the capital city of Bhubaneswar, as a Junior college at first in a rented accommodation, which later expanded to become a degree college as a composite institution. The college was later shifted to its own building, situated on 5 acres of land. The college has been named after its founder, Dr Deba Ray, who established this institution with the co-operation of a few local enthusiasts.

Faculties 
The college imparts education in Arts, Science and Commerce streams as follows:

Science 
Physics, Chemistry, Zoology, Botany, Mathematics, IT, Computer

Commerce 
Commerce

See also 
 List of institutions of higher education in Odisha

References

External links 
 Higher Education Department, Govt. of Orissa

Universities and colleges in Bhubaneswar
1982 establishments in Orissa
Educational institutions established in 1982